SS St. Olaf was a Liberty ship built in the United States during World War II. She was named after St. Olaf, the King of Norway from 1015 to 1028. He was posthumously given the title Rex Perpetuus Norvegiae (English: Eternal/Perpetual King of Norway) and canonised at Nidaros, by Bishop Grimkell, one year after his death in the Battle of Stiklestad.

Construction
St. Olaf was laid down on 6 January 1942, under a Maritime Commission (MARCOM) contract, MCE hull 33, by the Bethlehem-Fairfield Shipyard, Baltimore, Maryland; and was launched on 12 April 1942.

History
She was allocated to Union Sulphur Co.Inc., on 20 May 1942.

On 22 November 1943, she was purchased by the United States Department of War to be converted to a hospital ship. From 23 November to late July 1944, she was converted at Simpson Yard, in Boston, by Bethlehem Steel Co. She was commissioned USAHS St. Olaf in July 1944. She had been given the name Jasmine but this wasn't used.

During the war, St. Olaf operated in the European-African-Middle East and Asiatic-Pacific Theaters. She was decommissioned in November 1945.

She was refit at Standard Shipbuilding Co., San Pedro, California, to a transport ship, for returning military personnel and their dependents from Alaska, to Seattle, Washington. She was recommissioned USAT St. Olaf in 1946, and again decommissioned in June 1947.

On 24 June 1947, she was laid up in the National Defense Reserve Fleet, Astoria, Oregon. She was sold for scrapping on 1 April 1963, to Zidell Explorations, Inc., for $62,023.26. She was removed from the fleet on 12 April 1963.

References

Bibliography

 
 
 
 
 
   

 

Liberty ships
Ships built in Baltimore
1942 ships
Hospital ships of the United States Army
Transport ships of the United States Army